Tehuacana is a town near the Tehuacana Hills in Limestone County, Texas, United States. The population was 283 at the 2010 census. From 1869 until 1902, the town was home to Trinity University.

History
A post office called "Tewockony Springs" was established in what is now known as Tehuacana in 1847. It was named for the Tawakoni Indians, who lived in the area until the late 1840s. In 1850, the town came in second in an election held to decide the new Texas state capitol, which Austin ultimately won. When Tehuacana Academy opened in 1852, the community was known as Tehuacana Hills, though the post office continued to be called after the springs. The post office was discontinued during the Civil War, but service resumed in 1869, at which time the name of the office was changed to Tehuacana.

Geography

Tehuacana is located at  (31.742338, –96.545560).

Demographics

As of the census of 2000, there were 307 people, 132 households, and 86 families residing in the town. The population density was 190.3 people per square mile (73.6/km2). There were 147 housing units at an average density of 91.1 per square mile (35.3/km2). The racial makeup of the town was 89.25% White, 7.49% African American, 2.93% from other races, and 0.33% from two or more races. Hispanic or Latino of any race were 2.93% of the population.

There were 132 households, out of which 30.3% had children under the age of 18 living with them, 54.5% were married couples living together, 8.3% had a female householder with no husband present, and 34.1% were non-families. 33.3% of all households were made up of individuals, and 18.2% had someone living alone who was 65 years of age or older. The average household size was 2.33 and the average family size was 2.89.

In the town, the population was spread out, with 23.5% under the age of 18, 10.7% from 18 to 24, 23.5% from 25 to 44, 27.0% from 45 to 64, and 15.3% who were 65 years of age or older. The median age was 42 years. For every 100 females, there were 100.7 males. For every 100 females age 18 and over, there were 92.6 males.

The median income for a household in the town was $35,469, and the median income for a family was $51,250. Males had a median income of $31,250 versus $21,786 for females. The per capita income for the town was $18,965. About 8.5% of families and 10.6% of the population were below the poverty line, including 9.1% of those under the age of eighteen and none of those 65 or over.

Education
Tehuacana is served by the Mexia Independent School District.

Notable people

 Benjamin Franklin Yoakum, railroad executive born near Tehuacana, pivotal for shaping rail transportation in Texas and the Southwest as a whole

References

External links

Towns in Limestone County, Texas
Towns in Texas
Ghost towns in East Texas